Arsène Lupin is a 1932 American pre-Code mystery film directed by Jack Conway and starring John Barrymore and Lionel Barrymore. It was produced and distributed by Metro-Goldwyn-Mayer.The film is based on a popular 1909 play by Maurice Leblanc and Francis de Croisset. Leblanc created the character Arsène Lupin, a charming, brilliant gentleman thief (in his case, actually a noble thief) in 1905. Lupin preys on rich villains.

Premise
The film portrays the battle of wits between the famous gentleman thief and his would-be nemesis, Detective Guerchard. It culminates in the theft and recovery of the Mona Lisa and Lupin's escape with the beautiful woman—also a thief—sent by the detective to trap him.

Cast
 John Barrymore as the Duke of Charmerace
 Lionel Barrymore as Detective Guerchard
 Karen Morley as Sonia
 John Miljan as Prefect of Police
 Tully Marshall as Gourney-Martin 
 Henry Armetta as Sheriff's man
 George Davis as Sheriff's man
 John Davidson as Butler
 James Mack as Laurent
 Mary Jane Irving as Marie
 Olaf Hytten as Party Guest (uncredited) 
 Leo White as Jeweler (uncredited)

Box office
The film grossed a total (domestic and foreign) of $1,110,000: $595,000 from the US and Canada and $515,000 elsewhere. It made a profit of $245,000.

See also
 John Barrymore filmography
 Lionel Barrymore filmography

References

External links
 Arsene Lupin at TCM
 
 
 
 Several lobby posters

1932 films
1932 mystery films
American mystery films
American heist films
Films directed by Jack Conway
Films scored by Alfred Newman
American films based on plays
Films based on adaptations
Films based on works by Francis de Croisset
Metro-Goldwyn-Mayer films
American black-and-white films
Arsène Lupin films
1930s American films
Films set in Paris
Mona Lisa